"Battle of the Bands" is the eleventh and twelfth episodes of the first season of the television series The Naked Brothers Band which was first released direct-to-DVD on September 4, 2007 and later premiered on television on October 6, 2007 on Nickelodeon. The episode is in the format of a rockumentary-mockumentary musical episode.

Plot
The Naked Brothers Band and another band, the L.A. Surfers compete in a “Battle of the Bands” charity event benefiting Little Kids Rock, a nonprofit organization that provides free instruments and lessons to kids in low-income cities.

Rosalina starts to fall for the L.A. Surfers lead singer, Bobby Love (Keli Price). Nat and Alex learned his false intentions while in the bathroom as Nat is trying to wash out the orange hair dye that he put on as part of his latte-drinking bad boy image that he attempts to pull off to impress Rosalina. Nat did this after seeing a picture of Bobby Love and worrying whether she prefers bad boys. Nat then says he will try to get along with Bobby, but as he enters Nat and Alex hide in a stall. It turns out that Bobby is just hitting on Rosalina to get to the Naked Brothers Band, and is lying about everything (his faux British accent, his actual signature (he uses a stamp), not writing his own songs, and his birth name, Robert).

Bobby even tells Matt Pinfield that Nat does not write his own songs, but he says that he did not. Nat wants Bobby to confess about his lies and he won't. At the concert for Little Kid's Rock, Nat asks Bobby to confess once again, and he does not. Instead, Bobby continues to hit on Rosalina and call Nat "Nate" which angers him, and Alex stands up to Bobby and steps on his foot, causing a huge fight. During that fight, Nat declares that the benefit concert is now a battle of the bands, and whoever loses has to give all of their profits from their next CD to the charity.

Cooper and the band apologize for their bad behavior, and Cooper apologizes on his own behalf because he had a dentist appointment to get head gear, and couldn't have stopped the fight before it started. Cooper asks the representative of Little Kids Rock, Patty Scoggins (Emily Richardson), if a “huge band in Old Europe” called “The Honey Bunnies” (who are actually Mr. Wolff and Betty), could be the opening act for the event. She says that she could see what she could do. They actually perform, and a European producer actually gets impressed by what they did.

Bobby and his band later try to come up with new songs for the concert. Since Bobby doesn't write his own songs, this is very challenging. He comes up with mediocre songs called “My Feet Are So Nice” and “I Love My Hair”. His bandmate's girlfriend, Rita, tells him how silly the songs are, and he just continues to tell her that she is not the boss of the feet or the hair song and that she is not in the band.

Later Nat fails to get Rosalina to believe the truth about Bobby, and while practicing their song for the battle, he and the band make fun of Bobby twice, and she quits, telling Nat that she "expects more from him". She tells Bobby that the band thinks that he is a liar and he does not care about the charity. Bobby tries to use words of encouragement like "Have you ever noticed that the word "lousy" is in the word "jealousy"? That's because jealousy... makes you feel lousy"; Rosalina tells him that he said that to her the day before. Rosalina asks if he was the one who told Matt Pinfield that Nat does not write his own songs. She also asked him what part of England he is from.

Bobby is stuck, because he is not from Britain. In a moment of confusion, he said “Hogwarts,” which is in Harry Potter. Bobby quickly dismisses the problem by asking Rosalina if what she is holding is the music from the Naked Brothers Band. She said that she "won't be needing it since she quit the band," and Bobby throws it away in the garbage. He then attempts to kiss Rosalina, but she refused, stating that she is "confused" and runs away. After Rosalina leaves, Bobby takes her sheet music out of the garbage and pilfers it.

At the concert, Bobby talks to Nat, saying he is sorry that Rosalina left the band but she "was a good kisser," and Nat lost control of himself and attacks Bobby. Nat is losing but fortunately, Alex scared Bobby away with a mere balloon that a little girl gave to him. She gave it to Alex after Bobby refused the gift and said "I hope your band kicks Bobby's band's butts!"

The Honey Bunnies open the show, but the audiences finds their song awful. Soon after, Bobby's band plays Nat's new song, "L.A.", which he stole from Rosalina and she realizes Bobby is a liar, and runs over to the band and says that Bobby stole it from her. She then hugs Nat and apologizes while crying. Nat forgives her. There is a net of balloons above the stage, and Rosalina wishes that "all of the balloons were made of cement" and they would fall on Bobby Love's big, fat, phony head. Then, Alex reminds Nat that he is afraid of balloons.

Rosalina pulls the rope, releasing the balloons. Balloons fall all over of Bobby's band, which causes him to panic and constantly yell in fear (in a non-British accent) for his mom and jumping on his bandmate, Pork, screaming: "I'm not playing games! They're touching my face!" Bobby Love and his band are booed off of the stage and gather at the dressing room. He expresses his anger because the band will have to dedicate all of the money from the next CD to the charity. Rita says that after this performance there won't be a next CD. Bobby Love hides his face in his hands in defeat and depression.

Cooper and Patty show the Naked Brothers Band music video “L.A.” that Nat originally wrote on the screen of a projector. Seeing this, Matt Pinfield, who previously supported the L.A. Surfers, gives an explanation of what just happened: The L.A. Surfers stole the song from the Naked Brothers and Bobby Love is really "balloon fearing surfer dude Robert Love from California. I repeat, Bobby Love is afraid of balloons, and is from San Diego".

Meanwhile backstage, Nat instructed Rosalina on how to play his new song, "Girl Of My Dreams". Nat and the band come out on to the stage, and tell the audience to give a round of applause for the Honey Bunnies and the LA Surfers; nobody cheers at all. Then, Nat introduces the song, which is dedicated to a “very special person” (Rosalina) and notes that he wrote this when he was in pain and now that he's happy, he can actually enjoy it. The band performs the song, "Girl Of My Dreams " and win the battle of the bands.

Cast

Reception
Common Sense Media awarded it a dim 2 stars, citing an “unrealistic plot”. It also recommends a showing age of 10+ because of some inappropriate content.

It was the number-one show for the week of October 6 for children ages 2–14, with 3.8 million viewers.

References

External links
 
 
 The Naked Brothers Band (TV series): Season 1 and The Naked Brothers Band: Battle of the Bands

2007 American television episodes
The Naked Brothers Band (TV series) episodes